The Hutchinson Wheat Shockers were a minor league baseball team based in Hutchinson, Kansas, in the United States. It played from 1917 to 1918 in the Class A Western League, from 1922 to 1923 in the Class C Southwestern League, and from 1924 to 1932 in the Class C  Western Association before a final season in the Western League in 1933. The team ultimately disbanded due to a combination of the Great Depression and dust storms.

Marty Purtell managed the team from 1923–24, and in 1933. Dusty Boggess managed the team in 1932.

Notable players
Bill Bagwell (1895–1976), nicknamed "Big Bill", left fielder.
Eddie Pick (1899–1967), third baseman.
Mose Solomon (1900–1966), nicknamed the "Rabbi of Swat" and "the Jewish Babe Ruth," in 1923 hit 49 home runs (a new minor league record) and led the league with a .421 batting average, while he playing primarily first base and right field.

References 

Baseball teams established in 1922
Baseball teams disestablished in 1932
Defunct baseball teams in Kansas
1922 establishments in Kansas
Defunct minor league baseball teams
Professional baseball teams in Kansas
1932 disestablishments in Kansas